The Northern Miner is an online newspaper published in Charters Towers, Queensland, Australia.

History
The Northern Miner was first established in 1872 by James Smith Reid. Reid established the paper only eight months after the discovery of gold in the regional Queensland town Charters Towers.

In 1876 Reid sold the paper to Thadeus O'Kane. As the owner and editor of the Northern Miner, O’Kane devoted himself and the paper to improving the lives of the miners working in Charters Towers.

Of the five newspapers published in the goldfields The Northern Miner  was the only one to survive the downturn in gold mining. The paper is still being published today from the same Gill Street address it has been at since 1878.

Digitisation 
The paper has been digitised as part of the Australian Newspapers Digitisation Program  of the National Library of Australia.

See also
 List of newspapers in Australia
 Charters Towers, Queensland

References

External links
 

Northern Miner
Publications established in 1872
Charters Towers
1872 establishments in Australia
Online newspapers with defunct print editions